Novaranea is a genus of South Pacific orb-weaver spiders first described by D. J. Court & Raymond Robert Forster in 1988.  , it contains only two species.

References

Araneidae
Araneomorphae genera
Spiders of Australia
Spiders of New Zealand
Taxa named by Raymond Robert Forster